Ahmed bin Abdullah al-Nami (Arabic: أحمد بن عبد الله النعمي, ; also transliterated as Alnami; August 17, 1977 – September 11, 2001) was a Saudi Arabian terrorist who boarded United Airlines Flight 93 as part of the September 11 attacks. al-Nami, along with Ahmed al-Haznawi are suspected to have carried the presumed bomb that was boarded in Flight 93.
Born in Saudi Arabia, al-Nami had served as a muezzin and was a college student. He left his family in 2000 to complete the Hajj, but later went to Afghanistan bound for an al-Qaeda training camp where he befriended other future hijackers and would soon be chosen to participate in the attacks.

He arrived in the United States in May 2001, on a tourist visa, where he would settle in Florida up until the attacks. On September 11, 2001, al-Nami boarded United 93 and assisted in the hijacking of the plane so that it could be flown into the either the U.S. Capitol or the White House. The plane instead crashed into a field in rural Somerset County, Pennsylvania during a passenger uprising, due to the passengers receiving information from their families of the three other hijacked planes that hit the World Trade Center and the Pentagon.

Early life and activities
Al-Nami, much like Wail al-Shehri, Waleed al-Shehri and Mohand al-Shehri, was born in the 'Asir Province in Saudi Arabia.  Born to the Quraysh tribe of Saudi Arabia, Al-Nami served as a muezzin at the Seqeley mosque after having reportedly become very religious sometime in early 1999. That autumn he left his family home in Abha in the summer of 2000 to complete the Hajj, but never returned – instead travelling to the Al Farouq training camp in Afghanistan where he met and befriended Waleed and Wail al-Shehri, two brothers from Khamis Mushayt in the same province, and Saeed al-Ghamdi. The four reportedly pledged themselves to Jihad in the Spring of 2000, in a ceremony presided over by Wail al-Shehri – who had dubbed himself Abu Mossaeb al-Janubi after one of Muhammad's companions. Dubbed "Abu Hashim", al-Nami was considered "gentle in manner" by his colleagues, and reported that he had a dream in which he rode a mare along with Muhammad, and that the prophet told him to dismount and fight his enemies to liberate his land.

During his time at al-Farooq, there is a curious mention under Mushabib al-Hamlan's details that al-Nami had recently had laser eye surgery, an uncited fact that does not reappear.

By October he had taken a prospective hijacker Mushabib al-Hamlan from Afghanistan to Saudi Arabia where they both procured B-1/B-2 tourist/business visas on October 28 – but al-Hamlan then decided not to proceed and is thought to have returned to his family. Al-Nami's visa application has since been reviewed, and while he mentioned that al-Hamlan will be travelling with him, he listed his occupation as student but failed to provide an address for his school, and listed his intended address in the United States merely as Los Angeles – in the end he never used this visa to enter the United States, and reported his passport (C115007, which showed evidence of travel to Afghanistan) as "lost", and procured a new one from Jeddah (C505363).  He used the new passport to acquire a new B-1/B-2 visa in Jeddah on April 23, again recopying his answers from previously although crossing out the lines regarding al-Hamlan and previous attempts to acquire a visa. He was interviewed by a consular officer, who again approved his application.  Records at the time only recorded past failures to procure a visa, so the officer had no way of realising that Nami had successfully received an earlier visa.

In mid-November 2000, the 9/11 Commission believes that al-Nami, Wail and Waleed al-Shehri, all of whom had obtained their U.S. visas in late October, traveled in a group from Saudi Arabia to Beirut and then onward to Iran where they could travel through to Afghanistan without getting their passports stamped. This probably followed their return to Saudi Arabia to get "clean" passports. An associate of a senior Hezbollah operative is thought to have been on the same flight, although this may have been a coincidence.

While in the United Arab Emirates, al-Nami purchased traveler's cheques presumed to have been paid for by Mustafa al-Hawsawi.  Five other hijackers also passed through the UAE and purchased travellers cheques, including Majed Moqed, Saeed al-Ghamdi, Hamza al-Ghamdi, Ahmed al-Haznawi and Wail al-Shehri.

2001

In March 2001, Ahmed al-Nami appeared in an al-Qaeda farewell video showing 13 of the "muscle hijackers" before they left their training centre in Kandahar; while he does not speak, he is seen studying maps and flight manuals.

On April 23, al-Nami was recorded obtaining a new US visa.

On May 28, al-Nami arrived in the United States from Dubai with fellow-hijackers Mohand al-Shehri and Hamza al-Ghamdi. By early June, al-Nami was living in apartment 1504 at the Delray Racquet Club condominiums with Saeed al-Ghamdi in Delray Beach, Florida. He telephoned his family in 'Asir shortly after arriving in the country.

In June, he phoned his family for the last time.

He was one of 9 hijackers to open a SunTrust bank account with a cash deposit around June 2001, and on June 29 received either a Florida State Identification Card or Drivers License.

He may have been one of three hijackers that listed the Naval Air Station in Pensacola, Florida as their permanent address on drivers' licenses, though other sources claim he listed the Delray condominium.

On August 28, al-Nami and Ahmed al-Haznawi reportedly bothered a Delray Beach resident, Maria Siscar Simpson, to let them through her apartment to retrieve a towel that had fallen off their balcony onto hers.

On September 5, al-Nami and Saeed al-Ghamdi purchased tickets for a September 7 flight to Newark at Mile High Travel on Commercial Boulevard—paying cash for their tickets. Ziad Jarrah and Ahmed al-Haznawi also purchased tickets for the same flight from Passage Tours.

On September 7, all four Flight 93 hijackers flew from Fort Lauderdale to Newark International Airport aboard Spirit Airlines.

Attacks

On September 11, 2001, Nami arrived in Newark to board United Airlines Flight 93 along with Saeed al-Ghamdi, Ahmed al-Haznawi and Ziad Jarrah. Some reports suggest Haznawi was pulled aside for screening while others claim there is no record of whether any of the four were screened; the lack of CCTV cameras at the time has compounded the problem. Nami boarded the plane between 7:39 am and 7:48 am; seated in First Class 3C, next to Saeed al-Ghamdi.

Due to the flight's routine delay, the pilot and crew were notified of the previous hijackings and were told to be on the alert, though within two minutes Jarrah had stormed the cockpit leaving the pilots dead or injured.

At least two of the cellphone calls made by passengers indicate that the hijackers were wearing red bandanas.  The calls also indicated that one had tied a box around his torso, and claimed there was a bomb inside.

Passengers on the plane heard through phone calls the fates of the other hijacked planes, and organized a brief assault to retake the cockpit. Three times in a period of five seconds there were shouts of pain or distress from a hijacker outside the cockpit, suggesting that a hijacker was being attacked by the passengers. The plane crashed into the Pennsylvanian countryside and all aboard died.

Aftermath

He has been portrayed by British actor Jamie Harding in the 2006 film United 93 and Asim Wali in the film Flight 93.

See also

 PENTTBOM
 Hijackers in the September 11 attacks

References

External links
 The Final 9/11 Commission Report

1977 births
2001 deaths
Participants in the September 11 attacks
Saudi Arabian al-Qaeda members
United Airlines Flight 93
Saudi Arabian mass murderers
People from 'Asir Province
Deaths in Somerset County, Pennsylvania